Ballard–Marshall House, also known as Marshall House, is a historic home located at Orange, Orange County, Virginia. It was built in 1832, and is a two-story, three bay,  brick late Federal Virginia townhouse dwelling. It is an example of an urban house form influenced by the Jeffersonian Classical style. A two-story rear addition was added about 1900, and the original front and side porches were replaced with ones in the Colonial Revival style in 1910. The house was converted to apartments in 1934–1935, and renovated in 1986–1988.

It was listed on the National Register of Historic Places in 1988.

References

Houses on the National Register of Historic Places in Virginia
Colonial Revival architecture in Virginia
Houses completed in 1832
Houses in Orange County, Virginia
National Register of Historic Places in Orange County, Virginia